Herbert Elvin may refer to:

 Herbert Elvin (trade unionist) (1874–1949), British trade unionist
 Herbert Lionel Elvin (1905–2005), his son, British education leader